Arteaga is a Basque surname. Notable people with the surname include:

David Arteaga (born 1981), Spanish footballer
Eldis Cobo Arteaga (1929-1991), Cuban chess player
Gerardo Arteaga (born 1998), Mexican footballer 
Humberto Arteaga (born 1994), Venezuelan baseball player
Ignacio de Arteaga, Spanish explorer
Jake Arteaga (born 2000), American soccer player
Jorge Arteaga (racing driver) (born 1986), Mexican racing driver and entrepreneur
Jorge Arteaga (footballer, born 1966), Peruvian football defender
Jorge Arteaga (footballer, born 1998), Peruvian football goalkeeper
José Luis Pérez de Arteaga (1950–2017), Spanish announcer, critic, journalist and musicologist
José María Arteaga (1827–1865), Mexican politician and general 
Manuel Arteaga (born 1994), Venezuelan footballer 
Manuel Arteaga y Betancourt (1879–1963), Cuban cardinal
Mario Arteaga (born 1970), Mexican footballer
Nohely Arteaga (born 1963), Venezuelan actress
Otto Napoleón Guibovich Arteaga, Peruvian general
Rosalía Arteaga (born 1956), Ecuadorean politician 
Stefano Arteaga (1747-1799), Spanish-born writer on theatre and music, active in Italy
Víctor Arteaga (born 1992), Spanish basketball player

Basque-language surnames